Lika ung som då is a 1996 Sven-Ingvars studio album.

Track listing
Jailhouse Rock (intro) (J. Leiber, M. Stoller (recorded 1958)
Lika ung som då (N. Strömstedt)
Sanna från Sunne (M. Flynner, M. Lindman)
Hus till salu (P. LeMarc)
Bara vara (P. LeMarc, W. Modiggård)
Marie, Marie (S. Hellstrand)
Månskensnatt i Åmotfors (P. Jonsson)
Minsta lilla tecken (N. Hellberg)
Varenda sommar blir din (N. Hellberg)
Ge allt du kan (P. Gessle)
Visa mej vägen (L. Lindbom)
Kyss mej stilla (P. LeMarc)
En sista doft av sommaren (D. Hylander)
Mina sommarskor minns (L. Lindbom)
Sommarskor (repris) (L. Lindbom)

Charts

References 

1996 albums
Sven-Ingvars albums